László Óváry (born 1 February 1970) is a Hungarian wrestler. He competed in the men's freestyle 48 kg at the 1992 Summer Olympics.

References

1970 births
Living people
Hungarian male sport wrestlers
Olympic wrestlers of Hungary
Wrestlers at the 1992 Summer Olympics
Sport wrestlers from Budapest